Patrick Roach (born March 4, 1969) is a Canadian actor and investor. He is best known for playing Randy on the television series Trailer Park Boys.

Early life
Roach was born in Halifax, Nova Scotia, but grew up in Dartmouth, Nova Scotia, to parents Jim and Julie Roach. He attended Saint Mary’s University in Halifax, Nova Scotia, and graduated in 1992.

Career
Roach is known for his large gut, as showcased both in Trailer Park Boys and Swearnet: The Movie.

For the first four years he appeared on Trailer Park Boys, Roach continued to work as a regional sales manager for Sparkling Springs, a bottled water company. He would film Trailer Park Boys on his vacation time, but in July 2004 he quit his job (which he had held since 1993) in order to concentrate on acting. He also appeared in a commercial for the telephone service Vonage.

When asked what it was like appearing shirtless in nearly every episode of Trailer Park Boys, Roach replied that "it was uncomfortable at first, but after everyone in Canada has seen you, what the hell". His character works as Assistant Trailer Park Supervisor and Weekend Trailer Park Supervisor. His character, Randy, is in an on-again/off-again relationship with the Trailer Park Supervisor Jim Lahey (John Dunsworth), whom he always calls Mr. Lahey. Lahey is largely dependent on his assistant for his daily care. Roach has commented in an interview that Randy is gay, though the show portrays the character as bisexual.

He was also in the original Trailer Park Boys short film before it was made into a series. His character was the basis for Randy, but was named Patrick and wore a shirt. In between shooting the show, Roach and Dunsworth traveled across Canada performing at comedy clubs and other music events as a stand-up/improv act. After Dunsworth's death in 2017, Roach created his own stand-up comedy show called Randy's Cheeseburger Picnic.

From 2009 to 2013, Roach worked at Investors Group as a personal finance consultant. In 2010, Roach reunited with many of his former Trailer Park Boys castmates in the new series The Drunk and On Drugs Happy Fun Time Hour.

Personal life
Roach has two children; Rebecca and Coady.

Filmography

Movies
 1999 [[Trailer Park Boys: as Patrick Lewis
 2006 Trailer Park Boys: The Movie as Randy
 2009 Trailer Park Boys: Countdown to Liquor Day as Randy (credited as Pat Roach)
 2014 Trailer Park Boys: Don't Legalize It as Randy (as Pat Roach)
 2014 Swearnet: The Movie as himself / Swearman
 2014 Swearnet Live as Pat Roach / Randy

Television
 TV Movies and TV shows 
 2001–2007, 2014–2018 Trailer Park Boys as Randy
 2004 Trailer Park Boys Christmas Special as Randy TV Movie 
 2008 Say Goodnight to the Bad Guys as Randy (as Pat Roach) 
 2011 The Drunk and on Drugs Happy Funtime Hour as Pat Roach 2 episodes 2011 
 2014 Epic Meal Time as Randy 2 episodes 
 2014 Trailer Park Boys: Live in Dublin as Randy
 2014 GGN: Snoop Dogg's Double G News Network as Randy 1 episode 
 2014 Trailer Park Boys: Live at the North Pole as Randy
 2015 Trailer Park Boys: Drunk, High & Unemployed as Randy 
 2016 Garage Talks as Randy 1 episode
 2019–present Trailer Park Boys: The Animated Series as Randy
 2021–present, Trailer Park Boys: Jail, as Randy 
 2021 “This Hour has 22 Minutes” as Jason Kenney.
 2021–present, The Roach Approach'', as himself

References

External links

1969 births
Male actors from Nova Scotia
Canadian male film actors
Canadian male television actors
Canadian male voice actors
Living people
People from Lewisporte